Charles Herman or Hermann is the name of:

Charles Herman, inventor of the Wonder Wheel, a type of Ferris wheel
Charles Herman, a character in the film A Beautiful Mind
Charles F. Hermann (born 1938), American political scientist
Charles "Tiny" Hermann (1906–1966), Canadian football player and track and field athlete.

See also
Charles Herman-Wurmfeld (born 1966), American film director
Charles Chuck Harmon (1924–2019), American retired Major League Baseball player